Neoterebra armillata is a species of sea snail, a marine gastropod mollusk in the family Terebridae, the auger snails.

Description
These shells are very variable in color and pattern. Usually they show a dark gray or brown color. The subsutural band is white, with brown spots.

Distribution
This species can be found in the western coast of America, from Lower California to Panama, Peru and in Galapagos.

References

 Terryn, Y. (2007). Terebridae: A Collectors Guide. Conchbooks & Natural Art. 59pp + plates.

External links
 Fedosov, A. E.; Malcolm, G.; Terryn, Y.; Gorson, J.; Modica, M. V.; Holford, M.; Puillandre, N. (2020). Phylogenetic classification of the family Terebridae (Neogastropoda: Conoidea). Journal of Molluscan Studies

Terebridae
Gastropods described in 1844